IBM UltraPort was a nonstandard USB 1.1 port used by IBM on its range of ThinkPad laptop computers.

Description

Electronically the UltraPort connector is identical to the standard USB port. UltraPort uses a proprietary mechanical connection, so UltraPort devices cannot be plugged into a normal USB interface. However, the UltraPort devices shipped with an adapter which allowed them to be attached to a regular USB port.

Select ThinkPad models from 2000 to 2002 came with an UltraPort connector on the top edge of the laptop's screen, and IBM sold a variety of laptop-relevant UltraPort devices, including webcams, speakers, and microphone arrays.

UltraPort was designed in 1999 in response to the proliferation of many laptop computers from Sony, Fujitsu, and others that had built-in cameras, but proprietary predecessor can be found on a released in 1996 ThinkPad 850 laptop.

See also
Compaq Evo's Multiport

References

USB
ThinkPad UltraPort
ThinkPad